Hinduism is a third largest religion in Australia consisting of more than 684,002 followers, making up 2.7% of the population as of the 2021 census. Hinduism is the fastest growing religion in Australia mostly through immigration. Hinduism is also one of the most youthful religions in Australia, with 34% and 66% of Hindus being under the age of 14 and 34 respectively.

In the nineteenth century, the British first brought Hindus from India to Australia to work on cotton and sugar plantations.  Many remained as small businessmen, working as camel drivers, merchants and hawkers, selling goods between small rural communities. Today, many Hindus are well educated professionals in fields such as medicine, engineering, commerce and information technology, constituting a model minority.  The Hindus in Australia are mostly of Indian origin; other origins include those from Sri Lanka, Fiji, Malaysia, Bali, Cham, Singapore,and Nepal.

History
The following dates briefly outline the arrival of Hinduism.
 As early as 300AD – Indonesian Hindu merchants make contact with Australian Aborigines. 
 1588 – Indian crews from Bay of Bengal came to Australia on trading ships.
 1666 – Domestic servants in European households left the port of Calcutta to take up labouring work in Sydney.
 1233 – P. Friell who had previously lived in India, brought 25 domestic workers from India to Sydney and these included a few women and children.
 1850s – A Hindu Sindhi merchant, Shri Pammull, built a family opal trade in Melbourne that has prosperously continued with his third-to fourth-generation descendants.
 1836 – The census showed a mere 277 Hindus in Victoria. The gold rush years attracted many Indians to Australia and across the borders to the gold mines in Victoria.
 1890 – The census showed that 521 Hindus were living in New South Wales.
 1907 – Just about 800 Indians lived in Australia, the majority of them lived in northern NSW and Queensland.
 1911 – The census counted 3698 Hindus in the entire country.
 1921 – Less than 2200 Indians lived in Australia.
 1971 – Swami Prabhupada arrives in Australia and founded first Hare Krishna centre in Sydney.
 1977 – The first Hindu temple in Australia, the Sri Mandir Temple, was built. Established by three devotees; Dr Prem Shankar (from Ujhani, UP), Dr Padmanabn Shrindhar Prabhu and Dr Anand, who bought an old house in Auburn NSW and paid $12000.00 to convert it into a temple.
 1981 – The census recorded 12,466 Hindus in Victoria and 12,256 in NSW from a total of 41,730 in the entire country.
 1985 – A Hindu society, the Saiva Manram, was formed to build a temple for Lord Murukan. Since its inception, Lord Murukan has been called 'Sydney Murukan'. The Saiva Manram has worked hard for nearly ten years to build a temple for Lord Murukan.
 1986 – According to the 1986 census, the number of Hindus in Australia surpasses 21,000.
 1991 – According to the 1991 census, the number of Hindus in Australia surpasses 43,000.
 1996 – Hindus with their birthplace in India made up 31 per cent of all Hindus in Australia. But the census also showed there were 67,270 Hindus living in Australia.
 2001 – According to the 2001 census, the number of Hindus in Australia surpasses 95,000.
 2003 – Sri Karphaga Vinayakar Temple was formed to build a temple for Lord Ganesha/Ganapathi/Vinayakar. Since its inception, Lord Ganesh has been called 'Sydney Ganesh Temple'. "www.vinayakar.org.au"
 2006 – According to the 2006 census, the number of Hindus in Australia surpasses 145,000.
 2011 – According to the 2011 census, the number of Hindus in Australia surpasses 275,000.
 2015 – Daniel Mookhey becomes the first Australian MP to be sworn into office by swearing his/her oath on the Bhagavad Gita.
 2016 - 2016 Census data states that Hindus comprise almost 2% of the Australian population, surpassing the percentage of Hindus(1.85%, as of the latest 1998 Census) in Pakistan.
 2018 - Kaushaliya Vaghela becomes the first Indian-born Hindu Member of Parliament in any Australian Parliament.

Demographics

Hindu population by year

Hindus by state or territory

Data from the 2011 Census showed that all states (and A.C.T and the Northern Territory) apart from New South Wales had their Hindu population double from the 2006 census. New South Wales has had the largest number of Hindus since at least 2001.

The majority of Australian Hindus live along the Eastern Coast of Australia, mainly in the cities of Melbourne and Sydney.  About 39% of Hindus lived in Greater Sydney, 29% in Greater Melbourne, and 8% each in Greater Brisbane and Greater Perth. The states and territories with the highest proportion of Hindus are the Australian Capital Territory (2.57%) and New South Wales (2.43%), whereas those with the lowest are Queensland (0.98%) and Tasmania (0.50%).

According to the 2006 Census, 44.16% of all Australians who were born in India were Hindu, so were 47.20% of those born in Fiji, 1.84% born in Indonesia, 3.42% from Malaysia, and 18.61% from Sri Lanka.

In Tasmania, Hinduism is practised mainly by the ethnic Lhotshampa from 
Bhutan.

Hindu converts
Hinduism is also more popular among the Anglo-Australians.  Many Caucasians in Australia also visit the Hindu temple at Carrum Downs (Shri Shiva Vishnu Temple) and learn Vedic Hindu scriptures in Tamil. The ISKCON Hindu community in Australia has 60,000 members - 70% of whom are Hindus from overseas, with the other 30% being Anglo Australians.  The 2016 Census noted 415 Hindus belonging to the indigenous community of Australia (Aboriginal and Torres Strait Islander people).

Languages
As per the Census of 2021, 13.0% of the Australian Hindus use English at home. English (88,832 or 13.0%) is the third most common language spoken by Australian Hindus, behind Hindi (155,242 or 22.7%) and Nepali (111,353 or 16.3%). The number of Australian Hindus speaking various languages in their home according to the 2006 census:

Indian migrants speak Hindi, Tamil, Gujarati, Telugu, Punjabi, Malayalam, Marathi, Kannada etc. 
Tamil by immigrants from India, Sri lanka, Singapore, Malaysia, Mauritius 
Nepali by immigrants from Nepal, Bhutan and India.
Bengali by immigrants from India and Bangladesh.
Fijian Hindi and Fijian by migrants from Fiji
Mauritian Creole by migrants from Mauritius
Balinese and Indonesian by Indonesian migrants
Other languages such as French, Malay, Sinhalese, Italian, Vietnamese, etc.

Hindu temples in Australia
The first Hindu religious centre was a Hare Krishna centre founded by Swami Prabhupada in Sydney. It was in 1977 the first Hindu temple in Australia, the Sri Mandir Temple, was built. Now, there are around forty-three Hindu temples in Australia.

 Sri Karphaga Vinayakar Temple, Sydney
Sydney Murugan Temple, Westmead
Sai Mandir, Regents Park, Sydney
Minto Shiva Temple, Sydney
Raghavendra swamy mutt, Toongabie, NSW
Sydney Durga Temple, Sydney
Perth Shiva Temple, Perth
Shree Swaminarayan Temple, Perth
BAPS Temple, Melbourne
Sri Venkata Krishna Brundavana, Melbourne
Sri Venkata Krishna Vrundavana, Sydney
Shiva Vishnu Temple, Melbourne
Durga Temple, Melbourne
Shirdi Sai Sansthan, Melbourne
Sankatamochan Hanuman Mandir, Melbourne
Melbourne Murugan Temple, Melbourne
Sri Vakrathunda Vinayagar Temple, Melbourne

Contemporary society
According to a national survey reported in 2019, Hindu Australians continues to experience the highest rates of discrimination even after being the model minority. The survey showed that a three quarters of respondents (75%) had experienced discrimination on public transport or on the street. The total fertility rate (TFR) among Hindus is also the second least (least being Buddhists) in Australia with 1.81, which is lower than Christians (2.11) and Muslims (3.03).

Overseas territories
Hinduism is practised by the small number of Malaysian Indians in Christmas Island.

Attacks on Hindu Community

 In January, 2023, three Hindu temples were vandalized across Australia namely the BAPS Swaminarayan Temple of Melbourne, Shiva Vishnu Temple of Carrum Downs, Victoria and ISKCON Temple of Melbourne with anti-Hindu graffiti by Khalistani Sikh extremists. High Commission of India to Australia condemned the repeated hate-crimes and the Australian High Commission to India assured support and solidarity with the Hindu community of Australia. Several top Australian lawmakers condemned the attacks on Hindu community's places of worship and stressed importance of respect in a multicultural society.
 In March, 2023, the Shree Laxmi Narayan Temple in Brisban was vandalized by Khalistani Sikh extremists with anti-Hindu graffiti on the walls of temple. Sarah L Gates, the Director of Hindu Human Rights suspects that the hate crime is an attempt to terrorize Hindu community by members of Sikhs For Justice (SFJ) headed by Gurpatwant Singh Pannun, an individual designated as terrorist by the government of India.

Image gallery

See also
Hinduism in New Zealand
Hinduism in Fiji
Hinduism in Vietnam
 Hinduism by country
 List of Hindu temples in Australia
 Religion in Australia
 List of Hindu empires and dynasties

References

Sources

 Byrnes, J 2007,' Hinduism', Religion and Ethics, abc.net.au
 "Indian Magazine Australia Indian Newspaper Australia Indian Events Australia". web.archive.org. 12 August 2014. Retrieved 9 November 2022.

External links
 http://www.chinmaya.com.au
 Hindu Council of Australia an umbrella organisation
 Vishva Hindu Parishad of Australia
 Hinduism Summit Melbourne
 Hindu Community Council of Victoria (HCCV)
 The Hindu Temple and Cultural Centre ACT
 Purohit Services 
 Religious Services
 Hindu Temples in Australia
 Hindu Swayamsevak Sangh

 
Religion in Australia
Australia
Australia
Sindhis in Australia